The 2020 Blue-Emu Maximum Pain Relief 500 was a NASCAR Cup Series race that was originally scheduled to be held on May 9, 2020, and was rescheduled to June 10, 2020, at Martinsville Speedway in Ridgeway, Virginia. Contested over 500 laps on the  paperclip-shaped short track, it was the 11th race of the 2020 NASCAR Cup Series season.

Report

Background

Martinsville Speedway is an International Speedway Corporation-owned NASCAR stock car racing track located in Henry County, in Ridgeway, Virginia, just to the south of Martinsville. At  in length, it is the shortest track in the NASCAR Cup Series. The track was also one of the first paved oval tracks in NASCAR, being built in 1947 by H. Clay Earles. It is also the only remaining race track that has been on the NASCAR circuit from its beginning in 1948.  Due to the ongoing COVID-19 pandemic, the race will be held behind closed doors with no fans in attendance with only essential staff present, guidelines for social distancing and use of the protective equipment equipped by team staff, and logging to help with the contact tracing efforts.

Entry list
 (R) denotes rookie driver.
 (i) denotes driver who are ineligible for series driver points.

Qualifying
Ryan Blaney was awarded the pole for the race as determined by a random draw.

Starting Lineup

Race

Stage Results

Stage One
Laps: 130

Stage Two
Laps: 130

Final Stage Results

Stage Three
Laps: 240

Race statistics
 Lead changes: 14 among 8 different drivers
 Cautions/Laps: 7 for 52
 Red flags: 0
 Time of race: 3 hours, 23 minutes and 56 seconds
 Average speed:

Media

Television
Fox Sports covered their 20th race at the Martinsville Speedway. Mike Joy and nine-time Martinsville winner Jeff Gordon will cover the race from the Fox Sports studio in Charlotte. Regan Smith handled the pit road duties. Larry McReynolds provided insight from the Fox Sports studio in Charlotte.

Radio
MRN had the radio call for the race which was also simulcasted on Sirius XM NASCAR Radio. Alex Hayden, Dave Moody and seven-time Martinsville winner Rusty Wallace called the race in the booth as the cars raced down the frontstretch. Dillon Welch called the race from atop the turn 3 stands as the field raced down the backstretch. Steve Post worked pit road for the radio side.

Standings after the race

Drivers' Championship standings

Manufacturers' Championship standings

Note: Only the first 16 positions are included for the driver standings.
. – Driver has clinched a position in the NASCAR Cup Series playoffs.

References

Blue-Emu Maximum Pain Relief 500
Blue-Emu Maximum Pain Relief 500
Blue-Emu Maximum Pain Relief 500
NASCAR races at Martinsville Speedway